Surfing Soweto  is a 2010 documentary film directed by Sara Blecher.

Synopsis 
Surfing Soweto is the story of a forgotten generation: Bitch Nigga, Lefa and Mzembe are three of the most notorious train surfers in Soweto. They represent a generation of alienated youth, born during the glowing promise after the demise of apartheid and yet without the skills or wherewithal to reap the benefits of their newly-won freedoms. Surfing Soweto shows them riding on the top of trains (train surfing) which in South Africa is known as "ukudlala istaff", ducking as they hurtle past lethal electrical cables, and also in the intimacy of their homes and families.

Awards 
 Tri-Continental 2010

References 
Notes

Sources

External links

Surfing Soweto, National Film & Video Foundation webpage

2010 films
South African documentary films
2010 documentary films
Documentary films about rail transport